Werewolves Within is a 2021 American mystery comedy horror film directed by Josh Ruben from a screenplay by Mishna Wolff, based on the video game of the same name from Red Storm Entertainment. It stars Sam Richardson, Milana Vayntrub, George Basil, Sarah Burns, Michael Chernus, Catherine Curtin, Wayne Duvall, Harvey Guillén, Rebecca Henderson, Cheyenne Jackson, Michaela Watkins, and Glenn Fleshler, and follows a group of people in a small Vermont town who get trapped in a snowstorm only to suspect one of them is a werewolf.

Plans for a Werewolves Within film adaptation began in October 2018, with Wolff writing the script and Ubisoft Motion Pictures producing it. Cast was announced in early 2020 and principal photography began in February 2020.

Werewolves Within had its world premiere at the Tribeca Film Festival on June 16, 2021, and began a limited theatrical release in the United States on June 25, 2021, followed by video on demand on July 2, by IFC Films. The film received generally positive reviews from critics for its screenplay, characters, and humor. It holds the highest-rated critic scores on Rotten Tomatoes and Metacritic for a film based on a video game.

Plot
Forest ranger Finn Wheeler is assigned to cover Beaverfield, a small town where the residents are divided over a pipeline proposed by businessman Sam Parker. Upon arriving, Finn befriends mail carrier Cecily Moore while also meeting Trisha Anderson and her unfaithful husband Pete, wealthy couple Devon and Joaquim Wolfson, blue collar workers Gwen and Marcus, and isolationist Emerson Flint. That night, a blizzard knocks out all power in Beaverfield, forcing the residents to take refuge in a lodge owned by Jeanine Sherman. The power outage occurs right before Trisha's dog is killed by an unknown assailant, which increases tensions in the town. Further conflict arises when Finn discovers that all of Beaverfield's generators were sabotaged and the body of Jeanine's missing husband Dave is underneath the lodge's porch.

The residents attempt to barricade themselves in the lodge for safety, but Pete has his hand bitten off by the same unknown assailant. Environmentalist Dr. Jane Ellis, an opponent of the pipeline, concludes that the assailant is a werewolf who is one of the lodge's current inhabitants. After announcing her findings, Dr. Ellis dies in front of Parker under ambiguous circumstances; Parker claims she committed suicide.

Those remaining in the lodge initially consider staying together to force the assailant out of hiding, but ultimately all but Finn and Cecily leave for their homes. However, with tensions having reached a boiling point in Beaverfield, the residents begin to kill each other. After nearly all the townsfolk are killed, Finn is attacked by Parker, who has armed himself with a crossbow and silver bolts. Parker accuses Finn of being the werewolf because he worked in locations where previous attacks occurred. Finn counters that there is no werewolf and Parker intentionally caused the paranoia gripping Beaverfield in order to have his proposed pipeline approved. Parker gains the upper hand against Finn, but a dying Joaquim manages to kill him.

While Finn and Cecily recuperate in the town's bar, Finn learns that Dave was Beaverfield's previous mail carrier. He then realizes Cecily is the werewolf. Confronted by Finn, Cecily acknowledges she turned the residents against each other to make feasting on them easier. She subsequently attempts to kill Finn in her werewolf form, but Emerson arrives and saves Finn and then helps Finn seemingly kill Cecily. Still alive, Cecily makes a final effort to attack Finn and Emerson before Jeanine finishes her off with a silver crossbow bolt from Parker's crossbow.

Cast
 Sam Richardson as Finn Wheeler
 Milana Vayntrub as Cecily Moore
 Wayne Duvall as Sam Parker
 Catherine Curtin as Jeanine Sherman
 Michaela Watkins as Trisha Anderton
 George Basil as Marcus
 Sarah Burns as Gwen
 Michael Chernus as Pete Anderton
 Cheyenne Jackson as Devon Wolfson
 Harvey Guillén as Joaquim Wolfson
 Glenn Fleshler as Emerson Flint
 Rebecca Henderson as Dr. Jane Ellis
 Patrick M. Walsh as Dave Sherman
 Anni Krueger as Charlotte

Production
In October 2018, it was announced Werewolves Within was being developed as a feature film, with Mishna Wolff set to write the screenplay for the film, while Ubisoft Motion Pictures would produce. Director Josh Ruben joined after his first feature film, Scare Me, got the attention of Ubisoft, who provided him with "a V.R. thing to play [the game]," he said. In January 2020, it was announced Sam Richardson had joined the cast of the film and would serve as a producer, with Josh Ruben to direct. In February 2020, Michael Chernus, Michaela Watkins, Cheyenne Jackson, Milana Vayntrub, George Basil, Sarah Burns, Catherine Curtin, Wayne Duvall, Harvey Guillén and Rebecca Henderson joined the cast of the film.

Principal photography began on February 3, 2020. While the videogame is set in a medieval village, the movie is set in the modern day and was shot in New York State's Hudson Valley, near the town of Woodstock. Locations included Main Street in Phoenicia, New York, and The Phoenicia Belle bed-and-breakfast, plus Cooper Lake, and The Golden Notebook bookstore in Woodstock. The historic Fleischmanns Yeast family estate, now the retreat center, Spillian, in Fleischmanns, New York, served as the Beaverfield Inn, and as production headquarters.

Ruben said the film's low budget prevented it from being able to afford to license the U.S. Postal Service logo, resulting in cast-member Milana Vayntrub playing a postal worker for the "'National Mail Service' or something." He also explained that the cast's wardrobe was deliberately exaggerated: "I wanted the wardrobes to look like they might get turned into action figures. Someday, someone may want to dress up as these characters for Halloween."

Release
After IFC Films acquired distribution rights to the film, Werewolves Within had its world premiere at the Tribeca Film Festival in June 2021. The film received a limited release on June 25, 2021, followed by video on demand on July 2, 2021.

Reception

Box office

The film grossed $575,783 in the U.S. and $416,115 in other territories, for a worldwide total of $991,898.

In North America, Werewolves Within opened in 270 theaters in its opening weekend and grossed $250,811. In its second weekend it made $115,250 from 209 theaters; it was also the most-rented film on the iTunes Store's independent, horror, and comedy charts.

Critical response
The site's critics consensus reads, "Werewolves Within is the rare horror comedy that offers equal helpings of either genre -- and adds up to a whole lot of fun in the bargain." According to Metacritic, which assigned a weighted average score of 66 out of 100 based on 17 critics, the film received "generally favorable reviews". It is the highest-rated film based on a video game.

Variety said that "despite all the severed, bloody body parts ... Werewolves Within is more playfully thrilling than scary in tone" and that the screenwriter "fashions all her characters with memorable attributes and plenty of social observations, yielding a compelling range of suspects none of which you can write off entirely." The L.A. Times called it "[b]oth funny and snappy," and that its "catchy concept is made even more entertaining by a cast of accomplished comic actors." But, it said, there was "an overall lack of urgency or danger, related to the comedic tone. Because the characters are a bit silly, it's hard to become too invested in whether or not they get disemboweled."

Calling the movie "Clue with werewolves," The A.V. Club said Ruben's "sensibilities shine lunar bright through the way the film privileges collisions of personality in contained spaces over creature-feature thrills."

See also
 List of films based on video games

References

External links
 
 

2021 films
2021 comedy horror films
2020s monster movies
2020s slasher films
American comedy horror films
Films set in Vermont
Films shot in New York (state)
LGBT-related black comedy films
LGBT-related comedy horror films
IFC Films films
Live-action films based on video games
American werewolf films
2020s English-language films
2020s American films